Suess is a small lunar impact crater on the Oceanus Procellarum. It is a circular, cup-shaped feature with a higher albedo than the surroundings. The closest significant crater is Reiner, about 150 kilometers to the west-northwest. The lunar mare that surrounds Suess is marked by the rays radiating from the crater Kepler to the east-northeast.

The long, sinuous rille named Rima Suess begins about 30 kilometers to the east of Suess, and winds its way in a generally north-northwesterly direction for a length of almost 200 kilometers.

Satellite craters
By convention, these features are identified on lunar maps by placing the letter on the side of the crater midpoint that is closest to Suess.

References

 
 
 
 
 
 
 
 
 
 
 
 

Impact craters on the Moon